Prempura is a village in Kaithal district in Haryana, India.

Villages in Kaithal district